Wien Air Alaska Flight 99 was a scheduled domestic passenger flight in Alaska to St. Lawrence Island in the Bering Sea. On approach to Gambell on 30 August 1975, it crashed into Sevuokuk Mountain, east of the airport's runway. Of the 32 on board, ten were killed, including the pilot and co-pilot. The Fairchild F-27B aircraft was operated by Wien Air Alaska.

Flight
Flight 99 originated in Nome on Saturday, 30 August 1975, bound for Savoonga and Gambell. The flight from Nome to Savoonga was uneventful, and the plane departed Savoonga for Gambell at 1:27 pm Bering daylight time. As Gambell did not have a control tower, the Wien agent at Gambell, upon hearing the plane radio its departure from Savoonga, turned on the non-directional beacon at Gambell to aid the flights crew in navigation.

Fog was prevalent in the Gambell area, and the crew discussed strategies to land at the airport. After several missed approaches, the plane flew north over the community, and turned east, and then south to make one final pass.

A fire broke out, and the residents of the village came to aid, attempting to put the fire out with hand-held extinguishers. All but one of the injured passengers were able to escape the wreckage. Most of the injured or killed passengers were natives of Nome, Gambell, or Savoonga.

Cause
The cause of the crash, according to the NTSB, was improper IFR (Instrument flight rules) operation, failing to adhere to instrument approach procedures. The airplane collided with a mountain on a missed approach to landing, after multiple missed approaches. The weather at the airport was unsafe for landing, with a low ceiling and sea fog.

References

External links 
 Accident Description at the Aviation Safety Network

Aviation accidents and incidents in the United States in 1975
Airliner accidents and incidents involving fog
Airliner accidents and incidents involving controlled flight into terrain
Accidents and incidents involving the Fairchild F-27
Airliner accidents and incidents in Alaska
Wien Air Alaska accidents and incidents
Nome Census Area, Alaska
1975 in Alaska
August 1975 events in the United States
Airliner accidents and incidents caused by weather
Airliner accidents and incidents caused by pilot error